Platinum Air Linhas Aéreas was a failed airline project from São Paulo, Brazil in order to offer aircraft lease services and charter flights out of São Paulo-Guarulhos International Airport using Boeing 727-200 aircraft. Founded in early 2007, the airline never became operational and was disbranded in 2009.

References

Companies based in São Paulo
Airlines established in 2007
Airlines disestablished in 2009
Defunct airlines of Brazil